The fourth-seeded Daphne Akhurst and Gar Moon defeated the first seeds Marjorie Cox and Jack Crawford 6–0, 7–5 in the final, to win the mixed doubles tennis title at the 1929 Australian Championships.

Seeds

  Marjorie Cox /  Jack Crawford (final)
  Meryl O'Hara Wood /  Pat O'Hara Wood (semifinals)
  Mall Molesworth /  Colin Gregory (quarterfinals)
  Daphne Akhurst /  Gar Moon (champions)

Draw

Draw

Notes

 Page didn't show up at all because of health issues.
 Turnbull severely injured his thumb the preceding day in the Linton Cup final.
 Possibly Vera Lucy Mathias.

References

External links
 Source for seedings

1929 in Australian tennis
Mixed Doubles